The order of acquisition is a concept in language acquisition describing the specific order in which all language learners acquire the grammatical features of their first language. This concept is based on the observation that all children acquire their first language in a fixed, universal order, regardless of the specific grammatical structure of the language they learn. Linguistic research has largely confirmed that this phenomenon is true for first-language learners; order of acquisition for second-language learners is much less consistent. It is not clear why the order differs for second-language learners, though current research suggests this variability may stem from first-language interference or general cognitive interference from nonlinguistic mental faculties.

Research background 
Researchers have found a very consistent order in the acquisition of first-language structures by children, which has drawn interest from Second Language Acquisition (SLA) scholars. Considerable effort has been devoted to testing the "identity hypothesis", which asserts that first and second language acquisitions may conform to similar patterns. This, however, has not been confirmed, perhaps because second-language learners' cognition and affect states are more developed. The two may have common neurological bases, but no convincing scientific evidence supports this hypothesis.

There is research to suggest that most SLA learners begin their learning process with a silent period in which the learners begin to process pieces of the language they hear. This is considered a period of "language shock", in which they ignore some of the incomprehensible input of the new language. However, research has shown that many "silent learners" are engaging in private speech, sometimes called "self-talk". While appearing silent, they are rehearsing important survival phrases (lexical chunks). These memorized phrases are soon used in various situations, either by choice or necessity. Fewer learners have no silent period and pass directly into patterned speech. This speech is used to accomplish basic communication, often showing few departures from detached words strung together, which in time leads to more fluid phrases. Grammar of the target language is also simplified and the learners begin to construct an understanding of the second language, often attempting "sentences" that mix words or phrases from both their first and second languages.

The nature of the transition between formulaic and simplified speech has been disputed. Some researchers, including Stephen Krashen, have argued that there is no cognitive relationship between the two and that the transition is abrupt. Thinkers influenced by recent theories of the lexicon prefer to view native speech as heavily formulaic. They interpret the transition as a process of gradually developing a broader repertory of survival phrases (chunks) with a deeper understanding of the rules which govern them. Some studies have supported both views. It is likely that the process depends in great part on the individual styles of the learners.

A flurry of studies took place in the 1970s examining whether a consistent order of morpheme acquisition could be shown. A majority of these studies showed fairly consistent orders of acquisition for selected morphemes. For example: Among English, as additional language learners of English, the cluster of features, including the suffix "-ing", the plural form, and the linguistic copula were found to consistently precede others, i.e.; the  grammar article, auxiliary verb, and third person singular form.  However, studies were widely criticized, as insufficient attention was given to the overuse of these features.  More recent scholarship prefers to view the acquisition of each linguistic feature as a gradual and complex process. In this case there were idiosyncratic uses considered outside the obligatory contexts in the L2 and sporadic, but inconsistent use of the features. For that reason most scholarship since the 1980s has focused on the sequence rather than the order of feature acquisition.

Sequence of acquisition

A study of natural order of morpheme acquisition was done by Roger Brown. His research has shown that there appears to be a fixed pattern of morpheme development in first language acquisition. Followed by studies that showed similar patterns for L2 acquisition, the view that the order of morpheme acquisition of English is consistent and relatively independent of the L1 has been dominant ever since, but recent studies have expressed results that challenge this view, and maintain that the morpheme acquisition order is at least partly L1-dependent.

A number of studies have looked into the sequence of acquisition of pronouns by learners of various Indo-European languages. These are reviewed by Ellis. They show that learners begin by omitting pronouns or using them indiscriminately: for example, using "I" to refer to all agents. Learners then acquire a single pronoun feature, often person, followed by number and eventually by gender. Little evidence of interference from the learner's first language has been found; it appears that learners use pronouns based entirely on their inferences about target language structure.

Studies on the acquisition of word order in German have shown that most learners begin with a word order based on their native language. This indicates that certain aspects of interlanguage syntax are influenced by the learners' first language, although others are not.

Research on the sequence of acquisition of words is exhaustively reviewed by Nation (2001). Kasper and Rose have thoroughly researched the sequence of acquisition of pragmatic features. In both fields, consistent patterns have emerged and have been the object of considerable theorizing.

Notes

References 

Language acquisition